The Strangler is a 1932 British crime film directed by Norman Lee and starring Jack Morrison, Moira Lynd and Lewis Dayton. It was made at Welwyn Studios.

Cast
 Jack Morrison as Johnnie Scott  
 Moira Lynd as Rosie Platt  
 Lewis Dayton as Lee MacArthur  
 Molly Lamont as Frances Marsden  
 Cecil Ramage as Dr. Bevan  
 Carol Coombe as Billie Southgate  
 Hal Gordon as Leveridge  
 Patrick Susands as Eckersley

References

Bibliography
 Low, Rachael. Filmmaking in 1930s Britain. George Allen & Unwin, 1985.
 Wood, Linda. British Films, 1927-1939. British Film Institute, 1986.

External links

1932 films
British crime films
1932 crime films
Films shot at Welwyn Studios
Films directed by Norman Lee
Films set in England
British black-and-white films
1930s English-language films
1930s British films